Pirniče may also refer to:

Zgornje Pirniče (literally, 'Upper Pirniče'), a village on the bank of the Sava River in the Municipality of Medvode in Slovenia
Spodnje Pirniče (literally, 'Lower Pirniče'), a village on the bank of the Sava River in the Municipality of Medvode in Slovenia

See also 
 
 

Populated places in the Municipality of Medvode